Tell Her Everything is the third book by Mirza Waheed which was published in 2018 by Westland Books and republished on 7 February 2023 by Melville House Publishing.

Critical reception 
Jury of The Hindu Literary Prize described the book as "sensitive and complex", Saudamini Jain of Hindustan Times wrote: "Tell Her Everything is a sedate exploration of moral accountability, of the ethics and emotions of morality." Sanjay Sipahimalani of Scroll.in wrote "The author's third novel is the digressive first-person account of a doctor reliving a difficult past."

The book has been also reviewed by Somak Ghoshal of Live Mint, Vaishna Roy of The Hindu, Suma Nagaraj of Deccan Chronicle, and Karthik Shankar of HuffPost.

The book won 2019 The Hindu Literary Prize.

References 

2018 books
Westland Books books
Melville House Publishing books